The Colemanville Covered Bridge is a covered bridge that spans Pequea Creek in Lancaster County, Pennsylvania, United States. After Hunsecker's Mill Covered Bridge, it is Lancaster County's second-longest single-span covered bridge still being used.  It is also referred to as the Martic Forge Covered Bridge and Pequea #12 Bridge.

The bridge has a single span, wooden, double Burr arch trusses design with the addition of steel hanger rods.  The deck is made from oak planks.  It is painted red, the traditional color of Lancaster County covered bridges, on both the inside and outside.  Both approaches to the bridge are painted red with white trim.

The bridge's WGCB Number is 38-36-26.  In 1980 it was added to the National Register of Historic Places as structure number 80003534.
The bridge is located on Fox Hollow Road just south of Pennsylvania route 324 in Martic Township, Pennsylvania.  It is located at  (39.898892, -76.342194).

History 
The Colemanville Covered Bridge was originally built in 1856 by James C. Carpenter at a cost of $2,244. After being damaged twice by flooding, it was partially rebuilt in 1938 by Edmund Gardner and 1973 by David Esh. Lancaster county completely rebuilt the bridge in 1992 for $350,000.

Gallery

See also
 List of bridges on the National Register of Historic Places in Pennsylvania
 List of covered bridges in Lancaster County, Pennsylvania
 National Register of Historic Places listings in Lancaster County, Pennsylvania

References 

Bridges completed in 1856
Covered bridges on the National Register of Historic Places in Pennsylvania
Covered bridges in Lancaster County, Pennsylvania
National Register of Historic Places in Lancaster County, Pennsylvania
Road bridges on the National Register of Historic Places in Pennsylvania
Wooden bridges in Pennsylvania
Burr Truss bridges in the United States